George Mondo Kagonyera, also Mondo Kagonyera, is a Ugandan veterinarian, politician, academic, and university administrator. He is the immediate past chancellor of Makerere University, the oldest and largest university in Uganda. He was appointed to that position in 2007 by President Yoweri Museveni. After serving a full four year-term, he was re-appointed for another term in 2011, and was re-installed in January 2012.

Background and education
Kagonyera was born in Kabuga Village, Rukungiri District, in the Western Region of Uganda, circa 1941, to Zakaria Kagonyera and Elizabeth Kirihura. He attended Kigezi College Butobere for his O-Level studies, before he was admitted to Royal College Nairobi for his A-Level education. He studied at the University of Nairobi, graduating with the degree of Bachelor of Veterinary Medicine in the early 1960s. Later, he went on to obtain a Master of Science in Veterinary Medicine, from the University of California Davis, followed by a Doctor of Philosophy from the same institution.

Work experience
In 1967, he worked as a District Veterinary Officer for Masaka district for about five months which job he dropped to go for further studies.
In 1971, following graduation from the University of California with his Master of Science degree, Kagonyera joined Makerere University as a lecturer. He was instrumental in establishing the Faculty of Veterinary Medicine, which has since morphed into the College of Veterinary Medicine, Animal Resources & BioSecurity. He also served as the chairman of the university appointments board from 1993 until 1999. He left the university to join Ugandan politics in 1998. As a politician, he served as the member of Parliament for Rubabo constituency in Rukungiri District and as a minister for general duties in the office of the prime minister. He also served as the deputy managing director of the Ugandan National Social Security Fund from 2006 until 2008.

See also
 Education in Uganda
 Ugandan university leaders
 List of universities in Uganda

References

Succession table as chancellor of Makerere University

External links
Website of Makerere University

Living people
1941 births
People from Rukungiri District
Ugandan academic administrators
Ugandan veterinarians
University of Nairobi alumni
University of California, Davis alumni
Academic staff of Makerere University